Roberta Gentini (born 8 August 1973) is an Italian former equestrian. She competed in the individual eventing at the 1996 Summer Olympics.

References

External links
 

1973 births
Living people
Italian female equestrians
Olympic equestrians of Italy
Equestrians at the 1996 Summer Olympics
People from Novara
Sportspeople from the Province of Novara